Gottschea is a genus of liverworts belonging to the family Schistochilaceae.

The species of this genus are found in Southern Hemisphere.

The genus name of Gottschelia is in honour of Carl Moritz Gottsche (1808–1892), who was a German physician and bryologist born in Altona.

The genus was circumscribed by Jean Pierre François Camille Montagne ex Christian Gottfried Daniel Nees von Esenbeck in Ann. Sci. Nat. Bot. ser.2, vol.19 on page 245 in 1843.

Known species
According to Global Biodiversity Information Facility:
Gottschea borbonica 
Gottschea cheesemanii 
Gottschea cuspidiloba 
Gottschea fleischeri 
Gottschea fragilis 
Gottschea fuscella 
Gottschea gayana 
Gottschea graeffeana 
Gottschea spinosa 
Gottschea viridis

References

Jungermanniales
Jungermanniales genera